Edward Graham Taylor (3 July 1907 – 13 September 1959) was a Scottish rugby union player.

He also went on the 1927 British Lions tour to Argentina. He played in three out of the four test matches on the tour, including the third test on 14 August where he scored three tries. He also played four games against other opposition during the tour.

References

1907 births
1959 deaths
Scottish rugby union players
Scotland international rugby union players
British & Irish Lions rugby union players from Scotland
Rugby union wings